Joseph Oppenheim (March 1, 1859 – November 24, 1901) was an educator who invented the modern widespread manure spreader that made farming less labor-intensive and far more efficient in the early 20th century, and only he is honored for that invention in the Ohio Agricultural Hall of Fame in Columbus, Ohio.

Early life and teaching career
Born on March 1, 1859, in the small village of Kirchhundem, Germany. Oppenheim obtained a liberal education at universities in Bonn, Germany, and Innsbruck, Austria, and upon graduation from college at the age of 20 he immigrated to the United States.  He received a teaching degree in 1881 from St. Francis College in Wisconsin and after briefly teaching in Putnam County, Ohio, he returned to St. Francis College for further study. On August 9, 1883, he married Anna Mary Ellerbrock of Glandorf, Ohio. He then taught in Freyburg, Ohio, New Albany, Indiana, and Grand Rapids, Michigan, before settling in the small town of Maria Stein, Ohio. Oppenheim was “an accomplished musician, specializing in piano and pipe organ, ... a remarkable scholar, conversant with four languages, well read in literature, and an excellent speaker.” As an educator, Oppenheim became the first teacher in Ohio to receive a Lifetime State Teachers Certificate.

Educator turns inventor
In the 1890s, Oppenheim was a schoolmaster in the one-room country schoolhouse in Maria Stein, the town where John M. Kramer was building a “manure unloader” based on a patent in his name but claimed to be jointly owned by him, Fred Heckman and Henry Synck. Originally manure was thrown from a wagon. The unloader that Kramer built used a drag chain at the bottom of the wagon to pull the load of manure to the rear where it was shredded by a pair of beaters and deposited directly behind the machine, but with very little spreading to the sides.  As a result, farmers still had to take the time-consuming step of heading into the fields with peg-tooth drags or similar implements to spread the manure in order to prevent burning the soil.
 
As a schoolmaster, Oppenheim was concerned that the older boys often missed class at certain times of the year to stay home and work on the farm, usually loading and spreading manure. Not only was the chore backbreaking, but it deprived them of their education which Oppenheim saw as a need for the future.

While watching children play a game called "tom ball," Oppenheim noticed that when the ball was struck with the bat, which was actually a paddle-shaped board, the ball was deflected to one side or the other, depending on the angle of the paddle. Oppenheim saw this paddle-effect as the solution to the problem of manure spreading. He felt that a series of paddles could be attached to the rear of a manure unloader to cast manure in a wide pattern several times the width of the wagon.

To test his theory, Joseph, with the help of his oldest son, B.C. Oppenheim, knocked the end out of a cigar box and built a small rotary paddle distributor into that open end.  Each of the paddles on the rotary distributor was set at a different angle.  Then, Joseph and his son filled the cigar box with chaff and operated the small distributor with power from the drive wheel of a sewing machine.  The test was successful.  The chaff was thrown in a wide pattern.  After several other tests, Oppenheim became convinced that he had an idea that could be designed into manure unloaders.  When Kramer's machine shop was destroyed by fire and his business failed, Oppenheim obtained Kramer's patent in exchange for forgiving a loan he had made to Kramer and then obtained a patent for his own new idea.  Thus the widespread modern manure spreader was born.

Oppenheim’s New Idea manure spreader
Oppenheim's first New Idea spreader had two beaters.  The top beater was situated immediately above the lower beater and was smaller because pulverizing of the top part of the load was easier than the bottom.  Immediately behind the beaters was the famous New Idea  “widespread” which had a steel axle with several wooden paddles attached to it.  The paddles were six inches wide and eight inches long, fastened to the shaft at an angle to throw the manure outward.”

On October 18, 1899, Oppenheim broke ground for a small shop in Maria Stein, Ohio, where he could produce his new manure spreader, incorporating the “widespread” paddle device in addition to two beaters. Among the first employees he hired at the shop were Fred Heckman and Henry Synck. Synck, who later married one of Joseph's daughters, Wilhelmina, was said by contemporaries to have had “a genius for machinery and mechanics of all kinds.” and “in 1899 he entered the employ of  Oppenheim and gradually familiarized himself with the technique of the business.”. Neighbors around the town of Maria Stein started referring to the widespread manure spreaders as “Oppenheim’s new idea” and Joseph adopted this as the name for the business.

Only two manure spreaders were produced the first year of operation and fourteen the following year. Oppenheim did not live long enough to realize any financial reward, for he died on November 24, 1901, as one of the victims of typhoid fever that struck the small village.  But his wife, Anna Mary, carried on operations of the New Idea Spreader Works by using the money obtained from Joseph's insurance policy. Joseph's son, B.C. Oppenheim, became the president in place of his father and Henry Synck was in charge of production.  Not only did the business carry on, it thrived on brisk sales of the New Idea spreader.

In 1902 a new model spreader was introduced not only with a greatly reduced draft to lighten the burden on horses, but also with the upper beater moved slightly forward adding to the efficiency of both beaters.

Rapid growth of the New Idea Company
In 1904 the company changed its name to the New Idea Spreader Company and demand for its manure spreaders increased steadily until it soon outgrew its first little shop. On July 1, 1907, the New Idea Spreader Company, while maintaining operations at Maria Stein, opened a  factory in nearby Coldwater, Ohio where it had the advantage of two railroads on which it could ship the spreaders.  In 1912, all operations were moved to a new  factory on twenty acres in Coldwater with all machinery driven by electricity. By 1916 the New Idea Spreader Company had branches in eight states and an assembly plant in Guelph, Ontario. “[The] net assets of the firm were over one million dollars with total sales for that year of $1,250,000.”  Eight years later, in 1924, the factory was turning out 125 manure spreaders in an eight-hour day and had a profit of two million dollars.

“To meet the changing business environment, the company was incorporated in 1920 as the New Idea Company; however the stock was not publicly traded and it remained a held family corporation” until 1937 when it began to take on outside investors.

When B.C. Oppenheim died in 1935, Joseph's son-in-law, Henry Synck, who was one of Oppenheim's first employees, became president.  Ten years later, in October 1945, Joseph Oppenheim's heirs, all of whom worked from the beginning in sales and production, sold their controlling interest in New Idea to AVCO.
In 1984 AVCO sold the New Idea line of farm machinery to White Farm Equipment Company, part of the Allied Corporation, which formed White-New Idea which sold the company to AGCO in 1993.  On December 8, 1999, nearly 100 years after Joseph Oppenheim patented his invention, AGCO announced that it would close the New Idea manufacturing facilities in Coldwater, Ohio because “reduced demand for agricultural equipment” precluded it from remaining competitive.

Joseph Oppenheim was inducted into the Ohio Agricultural Hall of Fame in Columbus, Ohio by Governor James A. Rhodes on August 27, 1969.  His portrait hangs in the Ohio Historical Building on the State Fairgrounds.

Sources 

Joseph Oppenheim, Educator and Inventor (March 1, 1859 – November 24, 1901)

References
Mark J. Camp, Railroad Depots of West Central Ohio, Arcadia Publishing, Charleston, S.C. 2005, p. 35.
“New Idea Spreader Company” in Nevin O. Winter, History of Northwest Ohio, Vol. 3, The Lewis Publishing Company, Chicago & New York, 1917. page 1673, Print. Web access at https://archive.org/stream/historyofnorthwe03wint#page/1858/mode/1up (accessed May 17, 2011).
 “Bernard.C. Oppenheim” in Nevin O. Winter, History of Northwest Ohio, Vol. 3, The Lewis Publishing Company, Chicago & New York, 1917, page 1671, Print. Web access at https://archive.org/stream/historyofnorthwe03wint#page/1857/mode/1up (accessed May 17, 2011)
“Joseph Oppenheim” in Nevin O. Winter, History of Northwest Ohio, Vol, 3, The Lewis Publishing Company, Chicago & New York, 1917. page 1670, Print. Web access at https://archive.org/stream/historyofnorthwe03wint#page/1850/mode/1up (accessed May 17, 2011)
 “Henry Synck” in Nevin O. Winter, History of Northwest Ohio, Vol. 2,  The Lewis Publishing Company, Chicago & New York, 1917. page 824, Print. Web access at https://books.google.com/books?id=nNp5AAAAMAAJ&pg=PA824&lpg=PA824&dq=Winter+Henry+Synck&source=bl&ots=cmzcHzr-L_&sig=wSLbTR-A5anYCZaSzgmK8Icxluw&hl=en&ei=Jl_hTdaMAZKugQfHrv29Bg&sa=X&oi=book_result&ct=result&resnum=2&ved=0CCEQ6AEwAQ#v=onepage&q&f=false(accessed May 17, 2011).
U.S. Patent Office, Patent No. 648,519, Manure Distributor and Spreader for Joseph Oppenheim, Maria Stein, Ohio, Filed February 17, 1900.
 U.S. Patent Office, Patent No. 712,581 Manure Spreader for Anna Mary Oppenheim, Executor, Maria Stein, Ohio, Filed Nov. 4. 1902.
Courthouse, Shelby County, Indiana, Certificate of Partnership April 18, 1918. http://www.shelbycountyindiana.org/courthouse/partnerships/partners_new_idea_spreader_co.htm (accessed May 31, 2011)
The Country Gentleman
B.C. Oppenheim, “My Father’s Help to the Farmer,” The Country Gentleman. Vol LXXXII  Issue 42 Page 31, Nov. 17, 1917, Print. Web access at https://books.google.com/books?id=8OxEAQAAIAAJ&pg=PA1787&lpg=PA1787&dq=%22b.c.+oppenheim%22+%22country+gentleman%22&source=bl&ots=vVX7mLQJro&sig=dCa-t7Tuxzd4jC5F5z-CIQ9k0SA&hl=en&ei=gdXKTZDbK8negQeW-_XrBQ&sa=X&oi=book_result&ct=result&resnum=1&sqi=2&ved=0CBkQ6AEwAA#v=onepage&q&f=false (accessed May 17, 2011)
New Idea Advertisement, The Country Gentleman 1918. at www.flickr.com/photos/dok1/3417639257 (accessed May 17, 2011)
“One Million Farmers Will Read This Book,” The Country Gentleman, Vol LXXXI, page 2172, December 16, 1916, Print. Web access at https://books.google.com/books?id=8-1EAQAAIAAJ&pg=PA2&lpg=PA2&dq=%22Country+Gentleman%22+volume+LXXXI+1916&source=bl&ots=9NXH1Zp48y&sig=iLIa-61ueMco95cLUUMgJrB3ujI&hl=en&ei=-VjRTbP5Oc6dgQfh-5DLDA&sa=X&oi=book_result&ct=result&resnum=1&ved=0CBgQ6AEwAA#v=onepage&q&f=false] (accessed May 17, 2011) at page 2172.
Tharran E. Gaines, “100 Years of New Ideas,” FieldHAND, Spring 1999, p. 8
New York Times
“New Idea Plans Stock Issue,” New York Times, April 7, 1937
“Curb Admits Two Stocks,” New York Times,  May 13, 1938
“Scope Broadened by Aviation Corp.,” New York Times, October 30, 1945
Mercer County [Ohio] Chronicle
“Joseph Oppenheim Would Be 100 Sunday,” Mercer County Chronicle-Journal, February 26, 1959,  page 1
“New Idea Founder Inducted In Agricultural Hall of Fame,” Mercer County Chronicle, September 4, 1969, page 1.
“Coldwater Sesquicentennnial Edition,”  Mercer County Chronicle, July 28, 1988
Sophia Synck Bomholt, “Memories of New Idea,” Mercer County Chronicle, September 4, 1988.
Ivan Knapp, “More than one person invented the Manure Spreader,” Mercer County Chronicle, July 22, 1999, p. 1
 Ivan Knapp, “The Teacher With a New Idea,”,” Mercer County Chronicle, July 29, 1999, p. 4
 “7000 People Attend New Idea’s 100th Anniversary Celebration,” Mercer County Chronicle, September 2–8, 1999,  p. 1
 “New Idea Celebrates 100th Anniversary,” Mercer  County Chronicle, September 2–8, 1999,  p. 9
Celina (Ohio) Daily Standard
Cindy Birt, “New Idea, Its Start and the First 75 Years,” Celina Daily Standard, May 16, 1974, pp. 18–19.
“New Idea Development,”  Celina Daily Standard, August 27, 1999, page 7A, Sidebar.
Richard Payerchin, “Idea Becomes Village Mainstay,” Celina Daily Standard, August 27, 1999. Page 7A.
Brian Wayne Wells, “The New Idea Spreader Company of Coldwater, Ohio,(Part 1 of 2 Parts)”  Belt/Pulley Magazine, Vol. 11, No. 5, September/October 1998, Part 1, p. 1,  (accessed Nov. 8, 2010)
Brian Wayne Wells, “The New Idea Spreader Company (Part 2 of 2 Parts)”  Belt/Pulley Magazine, Vol. 11, No. 6, November/December 1998,  (accessed Nov. 8, 2010).
Ohio Agricultural Council, 4th Annual Ohio Agricultural Hall of Fame, August 27, 1969. Program page 7
Fred Heckman, “Early Manure Spreader History: Particularly of  New Idea,” Pamphlet, Coldwater, Ohio, July, 1939, p. 4,
New Idea  Company Silver Anniversary Booklet, Pamphlet, New Idea Co: Coldwater, Ohio, 1924.
Three Generations, The Story of New Idea” “Our 60th Year,” Pamphlet, AVCO, Coldwater, Ohio 1959, pp 1 &2.
“Avco New Idea Marks 70th Anniversary,” Avco New Idea Dealer News, Vol. 15, No. 10, October 1969, p. 2
“100th Anniversary, A Century of Excellence, New Idea 1899-1999,” Pamphlet, AGCO Corporation 1999, p. 3
Mercer County Notables website.,  http://billwendel.com/history/index.htm,(accessed, Nov. 9, 2010)
http://www.reference .com/browse/AVCO (accessed December 8, 2010).
http://www.agcocorp.co./company/history.aspx (accessed December 8, 2010).
PR Newswire, December 8, 1999. “1999 AGCO To Close Its Coldwater, Ohio Facility Lockney, Texas Plant to Cease Production by Second Quarter The Free Library(December, 8),  *http://www.thefreelibrary.com/AGCO To Close Its Coldwater, Ohio Facility Lockney, Texas Plant to...-a058077591(accessed November 21, 2010)”

1859 births
1901 deaths
19th-century German inventors